The 1999–2000 Rochdale A.F.C. season was the club's 79th season in the Football League, and the 26th consecutive season in the fourth tier (League Division Three).

Statistics

|}

Competitions

Football League Third Division

FA Cup

League Cup (Worthington Cup)

League Trophy (Auto Windscreens Shield)

References

Rochdale A.F.C. seasons
1999–2000 Football League Third Division by team